Myenchildae is a family of nematodes belonging to the order Aphelenchida.

Genera:
 Myenchus
 Myoryctes

References

Nematodes